Eftimov, feminine: Eftimova is  a Bulgarian and Macedonian patronymic surname and a patronym derived from the given name Eftim.

Anka Georgieva (Ani "Anka" Eftimova-Georgieva)
Georgi Eftimov
Inna Eftimova
Kameliya Eftimova
Nikola Eftimov
Pande Eftimov
Yordan Eftimov

See also

Efimov

Patronymic surnames
Bulgarian-language surnames
Macedonian-language surnames